Gordon is a city in Palo Pinto County, Texas, United States. The population was 478 at the 2010 Census.

Geography

Gordon is located at  (32.544121, –98.365978).

History
Gordon's history begins in 1864 with the founding of the community of Hampton, Texas. The town of Gordon was planned by the Texas and Pacific Railway one mile south of Hampton in 1874. The new town was named Gordon after the civil engineer responsible for surveying the townsite land. The railroad was built through the area in 1880, and the following year Hampton was moved to meet the railroad. The first classes at the Gordon School were held in 1882, and the post office opened on October 17, 1883 with local businessman Robert Rogan serving as the community's first postmaster. Gordon High School was built in 1887, and by 1889 Gordon possessed five general stores, three drug stores, three hotels, three cotton gins, and a reported population of 300 residents.

By 1901, Gordon had telephone service and the city got its own power plant in 1912. In the U.S. Census of 1920, the burgeoning community reported 1,000 residents; but the effects of the Great Depression brought prosperity to a halt, and by 1960 there were fewer than 500 people living in Gordon. The city has managed to survive as a point of commerce and shipping for local ranching and petroleum production. As of the 2000 Census, Gordon claimed 451 residents.

Demographics

As of the census of 2000, there were 451 people, 190 households, and 128 families residing in the city. The population density was 467.2 people per square mile (179.5/km2). There were 228 housing units at an average density of 236.2 per square mile (90.8/km2). The racial makeup of the city was 96.23% White, 1.11% Native American, 0.44% Pacific Islander, 1.11% from other races, and 1.11% from two or more races. Hispanic or Latino of any race were 5.10% of the population.

There were 190 households, out of which 28.4% had children under the age of 18 living with them, 57.9% were married couples living together, 8.4% had a female householder with no husband present, and 32.6% were non-families. 30.5% of all households were made up of individuals, and 22.1% had someone living alone who was 65 years of age or older. The average household size was 2.37 and the average family size was 2.93.

In the city, the population was spread out, with 25.9% under the age of 18, 7.8% from 18 to 24, 22.2% from 25 to 44, 23.5% from 45 to 64, and 20.6% who were 65 years of age or older. The median age was 41 years. For every 100 females, there were 79.7 males. For every 100 females age 18 and over, there were 80.5 males.

The median income for a household in the city was $33,056, and the median income for a family was $41,750. Males had a median income of $40,156 versus $20,781 for females. The per capita income for the city was $18,307. About 8.1% of families and 13.2% of the population were below the poverty line, including 21.4% of those under age 18 and 15.3% of those age 65 or over.

Education
The City of Gordon is served by the Gordon Independent School District.

Notable people

 Pat Caraway, Major League Baseball player
 Bob Richards, Former Olympic athlete and conservative political figure; raises miniature horses in Gordon
 Thurman Tucker, Major League Baseball player

References

External links
 Gordon Texas web site
 Gordon United Methodist Church web site
 Gordon Longhorns Football web site
 Gordon Community Library & Museum web site

Cities in Palo Pinto County, Texas
Cities in Texas